Tysaashvan is a village located in the Uzhhorod Raion (district) in the Zakarpattia Oblast (province) in western Ukraine. It was known as "Minieralnoye" between 1945–1995.

It had a population of 852 according to the 2001 census. 95,7% of the population (815) was Hungarian majority.

External links
 Tisaashvan (Tiszaásvány) – karpataljaturizmus.net
 Tisaashvan (Тисаашвань) of Ukraine 1:100,000 topographic maps

Villages in Uzhhorod Raion